The 1998 Tandridge District Council election took place on 7 May 1998 to elect members of Tandridge District Council in Surrey, England. One third of the council was up for election and the council stayed under no overall control.

After the election, the composition of the council was
Liberal Democrat 18
Conservative 17
Labour 7

Election result

References

1998
1998 English local elections
1990s in Surrey